

Read 
Read may refer to:
 Reading, human cognitive process  of decoding symbols in order to construct or derive meaning
 Read (automobile), an American car manufactured from 1913 to 1915
 Read (biology), an inferred sequence of base pairs of a DNA fragment
 Read codes, a standard clinical terminology system used in General Practice in the United Kingdom
 Read (computer), to retrieve data from a storage device
 Read (magazine), a children's magazine
 Read (surname), people with this surname
 read (system call), a low level IO function on a file descriptor in a computer
 Read Township, Clayton County, Iowa, in the United States
 Read (theatre), to perform the dialog of a play
 Read Township, Butler County, Nebraska, in the United States
 Read (Unix), a command in Unix operating systems
 Read Viemeister (1922–1993), American industrial designer
 Read (transgender), a term in gender identity
 Read, Lancashire, a town in the UK country of England
 Read, West Virginia, an unincorporated community in the United States
 Chicago-Read Mental Health Center in Chicago, Illinois
 The Read, a weekly one-hour pop culture podcast

READ 
READ may refer to:
 Reading Excellence and Discovery Foundation, a non-profit charitable organization founded in 1999
 Rural Educational and Development Foundation, not-for-profit educational network in rural Pakistan
 READ Global, a non-profit organization operating in rural South Asia
 READ International, a charity that aims to improve access to education in East Africa
 Rural Educational and Development Foundation, a not-for-profit educational network in rural Pakistan
 Reading Education Assistance Dogs, an organization promoting literacy using therapy dogs

See also 
 Reads (disambiguation)
 Justice Read (disambiguation)
 Reading (disambiguation)
 Reed (disambiguation)
 Reid (disambiguation)
 Redd (disambiguation)
 Red (disambiguation)
 Rede (disambiguation)
 Rhead
 Reade (disambiguation)